The 1995 Aigio earthquake struck Western Greece near the coastal city of Aigio at  on 15 June. The earthquake measured 6.4–6.5 on the moment magnitude scale. Significant destruction occurred; building collapses left 26 dead and up to 200 injured. The earthquake had a maximum Modified Mercalli intensity of VIII (Severe) and EMS-98 intensity of IX (Destructive). The horizontal peak ground acceleration reached 0.54 g,
and ground velocity peaked at —the strongest ground motion ever recorded in Greece. Monetary damages reached $660 million (in 1995 USD). Only 15 minutes after the mainshock struck, a large aftershock caused more damage to Aigio. In the aftermath, several countries and organizations provided disaster aid, including search and rescue and refugee assistance operations. Faulting took place on either the Aigion fault or an unnamed offshore fault. Other faults in the region have the potential to produce earthquakes up to  6.9, which poses a risk to Aigio and the rest of the Gulf of Corinth.

Tectonic setting

Western Greece is affected by the ongoing back-arc extension within the Aegean Sea Plate caused by the subduction of the African Plate in the Hellenic subduction zone. Stresses in the region create normal faults to accommodate the /yr extensional strain. In the Gulf of Corinth, various faults have formed as a result of these stresses to accommodate some of the fastest known rates of continental extension.

The Aigion fault is a north dipping, west-northwest trending, relatively young fault, that has been rapidly growing in the past couple of hundred thousand years through the linking of various fault segments. The fault is composed of two main segments: an offshore and an onshore portion, and they extend for  combined. It started developing at earliest 300,000 years ago, and its slip has increased over time. The onshore Aigion fault has a slip rate between /yr and /yr at a dip angle of 50–60° with a strike of 100°, while the offshore segment slips at /yr at a dip angle of 60°. The fault reactivated during this earthquake. It showed surface rupturing and produced its largest aftershock.

There are two other major faults near Aigio. The Eliki fault, which runs near the town of Eliki, and the Psathopyrgos fault, which is near the village of Psathopyrgos.The Eliki fault initially developed between 0.7 and 1 million years ago. The fault is split into two segments: the West Eliki and East Eliki faults. The Psathopyrgos fault is a major fault structure lying at the western end of the Gulf of Corinth.

Geology

Before the earthquake struck, various strange phenomena were reported in the region. Minutes before the  6.4–6.5 earthquake struck, people from various areas near the epicenter claimed to have heard the sound of a strong wind in otherwise calm weather. There were also multiple reports of strange animal activity such as dogs running away, and cats being frightened. Earthquake lights were also reported before the shock within a  radius of the epicenter. Reports of a "bright red glow" took place shortly before the earthquake struck. Fifteen minutes after the mainshock, the largest aftershock ( 5.6) struck and had a maximum Modified Mercalli intensity (MMI) of VI. Thousands of aftershocks were recorded daily.

Strong ground motion

This earthquake struck only a few weeks after a devastating  earthquake struck Greece. That event took place near Kozani on May 13, as the result of normal faulting. The Aigio earthquake a month later also took place as the result of normal faulting, on either the Aigion fault or an offshore fault. Studies disagree over the rupture characteristics. Computed and recorded accelerogram values indicate that inhabitants near the epicenter experienced 0.54 g of horizontal acceleration, as well as up to 0.20 g of vertical acceleration, which was double the maximum expected in the region according to the new Greek Seismic Code, updated only months prior. The peak ground motion lasted for 0.45 seconds, while strong ground motion lasted for 5 seconds. Aigio experienced the strongest shaking, and as a result had the most damage from the earthquake. The United States Geological Survey (USGS) ShakeMap for the event overestimates shaking near Aigio in comparison to synthetic modeling, likely as the result of the strong ground motion that was recorded at one station near Aigio. The maximum MMI was VIII (Severe), while the maximum EMS-98 was IX (Destructive).

Surface faulting
There are two main theories as to how the mainshock occurred. The first is that it occurred on the Aigion fault. The length of visible surface ruptures align with expectations for an earthquake of this size. The other theory explaining the mainshock is rupture along a low-angle normal fault  to the northeast of Aigio, and north of the Eliki fault. This scenario explains the surface rupture as secondary features created as the result of the high ground motion of the mainshock rather than true slip along the Aigion fault—as proven by GPS and inSAR data. The study also concludes that the earthquake likely increased the chances of an earthquake on the Aigion fault itself.

Impact

The shallow depth and strong ground motion contributed to the death toll and monetary costs. The earthquake caused 26 deaths and 60–200 injuries. It also left 4,000 people homeless. Deaths occurred in two parts of Aigio: at a collapsed apartment on Despotopoulon Street, and in the village of Valimitika where a hotel collapsed. Among the dead were 11 French tourists. Aigio and Eratini sustained substantial damage, with most occurring in northern Aigio. Four buildings collapsed, and between 1,071 and 1,887 houses were damaged beyond repair. In Aigio, 2.5 percent of all buildings were designated unsafe to enter and many were demolished. At least 231 reinforced concrete buildings and 212 masonry buildings required major repair, while 30 concrete and 361 masonry buildings were evacuated. Damage was most prevalent in central and eastern Aigio. The event was felt in Athens, Ioannina, Kalamai, Kardhitsa, Kozani, and Kefallinia. The aftershock caused additional damage including several building collapses.

Geological effects
Many surface effects were attributed to this earthquake, including liquefaction, submarine landslides, coastal retreat, and ground fissures. Normal faulting east-west oriented scarp formed from this event in the vicinity of Aigio. The main shock caused widespread liquefaction to various types of infrastructure. Liquefaction reportedly occurred over a  area near the coast between the mouth of the Selinountas River and Cape Trypias. Sand boils formed near Diakofto. Rizomylos experienced liquefaction, sand boils, expulsion of ground water, ground fissures, and sand blows. In Erateini, liquefaction, coastal changes, collapse of water front barriers, and cracking of paved park areas were reported. Along the north coast, liquefaction was sparse, mostly occurring near Erateini. Ground fissures were observed along the coast near Aigio between the Selinountas and Vouraikos rivers, as well as near Avythos. These fissures formed as a result of the strong shaking. Sediment failure was found at four sites within a  radius of the epicenter.

Drastic coastal changes were observed, such as at Erateini, where the sea moved  closer to land. Cape Trypias experienced dozens of meters of inundation. On land, there were only a few scattered rockfalls, although the coastal retreat as well as various other factors indicate a large submarine landslide. Later oceanographic surveys of the area provided more evidence and detail of these landslides.

Response
Shortly after the earthquake struck, the United Nations Department of Humanitarian Affairs sent a team of six rescue dogs along with an advanced rescue team from the Swiss Disaster Relief unit. A French team with dogs and medical supplies arrived to the scene to help out with search and rescue (SAR) operations. A second Swiss team with a 35-strong SAR team was also deployed to the affected areas. Various countries such as Germany and Denmark offered extra assistance, but the Greek authorities decided that the French and Swiss operations were sufficient for the relatively small scale disaster. By the following day, UK, German, and Danish-based rescue organizations had offered SAR assistance, while the government of Italy alerted an SAR team, its fire brigade, and health assistance unit. SAR operations in Aigio ceased a week after the earthquake, with 68 people having been rescued. Italy also offered to deploy 20 houses for 100 people, power generators, potable water treatment equipment, and the rescue ship San Marco to sustain the living needs of 400 people. Japan's government released 50 large tents and 1,000 blankets to help the affected people. To aid in reconstruction in the aftermath of the event, the government created a financing program to ease monetary losses. The program allowed people to take out 'seismic loans', of which 30% was free, and the remaining 70% was interest-free. These loans actually encouraged building bigger and taller buildings, which may have made the area more vulnerable to future earthquakes. Some buildings damaged by the earthquake were reinforced with concrete to make them more stable.

Controversy
Concern arose regarding the lack of an issued earthquake warning for the area by Greece's Earthquake Planning and Protection Agency. Panayiotis Varotsos, a University of Athens professor, employed his controversial VAN technique which he developed to forecast earthquakes. The system works by using electrical signals in the ground to predict earthquakes. Another warning came from Gerasimos Papadopoulos, a professor at the Geodynamic Institute of the National Observatory of Athens. His reasoning for issuing the alert was that a recent previous earthquake in northwestern Greece would cause another event within two months. As a result, a prosecutor accused Dimitris Papanikolaou—the director of the Greek earthquake planning and protection agency—of ignoring multiple warnings about the earthquake. This was met with outrage by the scientific community, and the acting director of the Geodynamic Institute of the National Observatory of Athens stated that the prosecutor would have changed his mind if he listened to Papanikolaou's colleagues.

Future hazard

A network of normal faults have developed to accommodate the deformation, including a series of linked large faults near populated areas such as the Psathopyrgos, Aigion, and Eliki faults. Many of these faults are in the later stages of their earthquake cycles, and may be ready to produce  6.0–6.7 earthquakes in the coming decades. The Aigio area is struck by  6 events roughly every 120 years, while the area in the southern Gulf of Corinth can generate events up to  6.9 in a multi-fault rupture scenario.

On the Psathopyrgos fault, major earthquakes occur at a frequency of every 350 years, with an estimated uncertainty of 175 years. The last known major earthquake to occur on this section of fault struck in 1756, which means that the fault is around 75% of the way through its cycle. Simulations show earthquakes with maximum moment magnitudes up to  6.42 taking place along the fault, while the maximum accumulated slip deficit (amount of built up energy since the last major earthquake) could cause a  6–6.5 event. The 1995 Aigio earthquake may have put more strain on the fault, allowing it to slip sooner.

Earthquake activity along the Aigion fault is well recorded, with events taking place in 1748, 1817, and 1888. The recurrence interval between large ruptures on the Aigion fault is roughly 390 ± 195 years. The eastern portion of the Aigion fault lies near where the Eliki fault slipped in an earthquake in 1861, although the Aigion fault is a few kilometers to the north and may act as a step-over. The fault could rupture with the Psathopyrgos fault to its west and create a  6.42 event, and empirical relations as well as accumulated slip deficit suggest a maximum of a  6.5 earthquake.

These faults are responsible for two known major events: one in 373 BC, and one in 1861. The role of the western fault is unknown, due to the lack of earthquake activity along its western portion. In 373 BC, a strong earthquake, potentially occurring on the Eliki fault, destroyed the ancient city of Helike. In 1861, an  6.6 earthquake struck the area and ruptured  of the Eliki fault. Maximum observed offset from the event was  Slip rate is estimated at /yr. The accumulated slip deficit on only the western portion of the fault is enough to create a  6.6 earthquake. The 1995 Aigio earthquake may have accommodated some of the stress that the Eliki fault was experiencing, thereby increasing the amount of time until the next major earthquake on the fault.

See also
1981 Gulf of Corinth earthquakes
List of earthquakes in 1995
List of earthquakes in Greece

Notes

References

Sources

Further reading

External links

1995 disasters in Europe
1995 earthquakes
1995 in Greece
1995 earthquake
Earthquakes in Greece
History of Central Greece
June 1995 events in Europe